Buridan's ass is an illustration of a paradox in philosophy in the conception of free will.
It refers to a hypothetical situation wherein an ass (donkey) that is equally hungry and thirsty is placed precisely midway between a stack of hay and a pail of water. Since the paradox assumes the donkey will always go to whichever is closer, it dies of both hunger and thirst since it cannot make any rational decision between the hay and water. A common variant of the paradox substitutes the hay and water for two identical piles of hay; the ass, unable to choose between the two, dies of hunger.

The paradox is named after the 14th-century French philosopher Jean Buridan, whose philosophy of moral determinism it satirizes. 
Although the illustration is named after Buridan, philosophers have discussed the concept before him, notably Aristotle, who put forward the example of a man equally hungry and thirsty, and Al-Ghazali, who used a man faced with the choice of equally good dates.

A version of this situation appears as metastability in digital electronics, when a circuit must decide between two states based on an input that is in itself undefined (neither zero nor one).  Metastability becomes a problem if the circuit spends more time than it should in this "undecided" state, which is usually set by the speed of the clock the system is using.

History

The paradox predates Buridan; it dates to antiquity, being found in Aristotle's On the Heavens.  Aristotle, in ridiculing the Sophist idea that the Earth is stationary simply because it is spherical and any forces on it must be equal in all directions, says that is as ridiculous as saying that

However, the Greeks only used this paradox as an analogy in the context of the equilibrium of physical forces. The 12th-century Persian scholar and philosopher Al-Ghazali discusses the application of this paradox to human decision making, asking whether it is possible to make a choice between equally good courses without grounds for preference. He takes the attitude that free will can break the stalemate.

Moorish philosopher Averroes (1126–1198), in commentary on Ghazali, takes the opposite view. Although Buridan nowhere discusses this specific problem, its relevance is that he did advocate a moral determinism whereby, save for ignorance or impediment, a human faced by alternative courses of action must always choose the greater good. In the face of equally good alternatives Buridan believed a rational choice could not be made. 
 
Later writers satirised this view in terms of an ass which, confronted by both food and water, must necessarily die of both hunger and thirst while pondering a decision.

Many later philosophers have addressed this problem of "choice without preference".   In his Ethics (ca 1661), Baruch de Spinoza accepts that his determinist philosophy implies that such a state of indecision could happen, but that this should be classed with other irrational behavior: 
Pierre Bayle (1647-1706) in his Dictionnaire authored some of the most comprehensive discussions of the problem. He recognized explicitly that if humans have the ability to make a decision between choices with no reason for preference, this means that humans have free will, and bears on man's rationalization of God's choices.  He regarded the previous examples of the ass or dates as artificial, and pointed out there are many real instances in everyday life in which a person must make a choice in which the choice doesn't matter to him, and that this presents no problem.
 
Gottfried Wilhelm Leibniz (1646-1716) believed, from his principle of sufficient reason, that if a person's preferences were really balanced no decision could be made, but that petites perceptions, small perceived preferences below the threshold of consciousness that are always present, explains why people are able to make such a choice.

Discussion
Some proponents of hard determinism such as Spinoza have granted the unpleasantness of the scenario, but have denied that it illustrates a true paradox, since one does not contradict oneself in suggesting that a man might die between two equally plausible routes of action. 

Other writers have opted to deny the validity of the illustration. A typical counter-argument is that rationality as described in the paradox is so limited as to be a straw man version of the real thing, which does allow the consideration of meta-arguments. In other words, it is entirely rational to recognize that both choices are equally good and arbitrarily (randomly) pick one instead of starving; although the decision that they are sufficiently the same is also subject to Buridan's ass. The idea that a random decision could be made is sometimes used as an attempted justification for faith or intuitivity (called by Aristotle noetic or noesis). The argument is that, like the starving ass, we must make a choice to avoid being frozen in endless doubt. Other counter-arguments exist.

According to Edward Lauzinger, Buridan's ass fails to incorporate the latent biases that humans always bring with them when making decisions.

Social Psychologist Kurt Lewin's Field Theory treated this paradox experimentally. He demonstrated that lab rats experience difficulty when choosing between two equally attractive (approach-approach) goals. The typical response to approach-approach decisions is initial ambivalence, though the decision becomes more decisive as the organism moves towards one choice and away from another.

Buridan's principle
The situation of Buridan's ass was given a mathematical basis in a 1984 paper by American computer scientist Leslie Lamport, in which Lamport presents an argument that, given certain assumptions about continuity in a simple mathematical model of the Buridan's ass problem, there is always some starting condition under which the ass starves to death, no matter what strategy it takes.  He further illustrates the paradox with the example of a driver stopped at a railroad crossing trying to decide whether he has time to cross before a train arrives.  He proves that regardless of how "safe" the policy the driver adopts, because indecision can cause an indefinite delay in action a small percentage of drivers will be hit by the train.

Lamport calls this result "Buridan’s principle":
A discrete decision based upon an input having a continuous range of values cannot be made within a bounded length of time.

He points out that just because we do not see asses or people starving to death through indecision, or other examples of Buridan's undecided states in real life, does not disprove the principle.  The persistence of a Buridan's undecided state for a perceptible length of time may just be sufficiently improbable that it has not been observed.

Application to digital logic: metastability

A version of Buridan's principle occurs in electrical engineering. Specifically, the input to a digital logic gate must convert a continuous voltage value into either a 0 or a 1, which is typically sampled and then processed. If the input is changing and at an intermediate value when sampled, the input stage acts like a comparator. The voltage value can then be likened to the position of the ass, and the values 0 and 1 represent the bales of hay. As in the situation of the starving ass, there exists an input on which the converter cannot make a proper decision, and the output remains balanced in a metastable state between the two stable states for an undetermined length of time, until random noise in the circuit makes it converge to one of the stable states.

In asynchronous circuits, arbiters are used to make the decision. They guarantee that up to one outcome is selected at any given point in time, but may take an indeterminate (albeit typically extremely short) time to choose.

The metastability problem is a significant issue in digital circuit design, and metastable states are a possibility wherever asynchronous inputs (digital signals not synchronized to a clock signal) occur. The ultimate reason the problem is manageable is that the probability of a metastable state persisting longer than a given time interval t is an exponentially declining function of t. In electronic devices, the probability of such an "undecided" state lasting longer than a matter of nanoseconds, while always possible, can be made negligibly low.

In popular culture
Lewis Cass, the Democratic candidate for president in 1848, was contrasted with Buridan's ass by Abraham Lincoln:  "Mr. Speaker, we have all heard of the animal standing in doubt between two stacks of hay, and starving to death.  The like would never happen to General Cass; place the stacks a thousand miles apart, he would stand stock still midway between them, and eat them both at once, and the green grass along the line would be apt to suffer some too at the same time." (This being a reference to Cass's support for "popular sovereignty" in the run-up to the Civil War.)
Buridan's Donkey, a 1932 French comedy film, is named after the paradox.
"Buridan's Ass" is the name of the sixth episode of the first season of the FX television series Fargo.
In the Doctor Who novel The Eight Doctors, the Fifth and Eighth Doctors are confronted by a Raston Warrior Robot. The Doctors stand exactly the same distance away from the Robot as it approaches them; unable to decide which to attack first (since the Robot attacks by sensing brain patterns, which are identical in the two Doctors), the Robot shuts down.
The lyrics of a song by Devo, the title track from their album Freedom of Choice, describe a similar situation:  "In ancient Rome, there was a poem / About a dog who found two bones" who then, unable to choose between the two, "went in circles till he dropped dead."
In the 10th season of The Big Bang Theory, Sheldon and Amy discuss the history of Buridan's ass (renamed donkey), and its application to their lives. Amy resolves the paradox (of Sheldon desiring to live in different apartments) by creating a more desirable option by engaging Sheldon in a discussion of the theory and its history.
On episode 2 of the 3rd season of Unbreakable Kimmy Schmidt (Kimmy's Roommate Lemonades), Kimmy learns about Buridan's Ass from Perry, a possible love interest and also a tour guide for prospective students at Robert Moses College for Everyone.
In The Witcher 3: Wild Hunt, a note can be found on a notice board from a farmer that is selling the meat of his donkey, who died of starvation because it was unable to decide between two different piles of food.
Aleksander Fredro, Polish 19th-century poet, tells a story about a donkey who died from hunger because he could not decide between oats and hay, served in two troughs.
 In the episode "Peace, Pity, Pardon" of the show Route 66, Lincoln Case told his buddy Todd Stiles that he wasn't sure he wanted his discharge papers from the army or if he wanted to re-enlist after being on leave. Stiles then related the story of Buridan's ass, but wrongly attributed the theory to a Greek philosopher. After telling Case about Buridan's ass, he said that "indecision has killed more cats than curiosity."

See also

Analysis paralysis
Catch-22
Dining philosophers problem
Hobson's choice
Fredkin's paradox
Lagrangian point
Morton's fork

Search cost
Spontaneous symmetry breaking

References

Bibliography

External links

Decision-making paradoxes
Fictional donkeys
Thought experiments in philosophy